ACG ("Animation, Comics, and Games") is a term used in some subcultures of Greater China and East Asia. Because there is a strong economic and cultural interlinkage that exists between anime, manga and games in Japanese and East Asian culture at large, the term ACG is used to describe this phenomenon in relative fields. The term refers in particular to Japanese anime, manga and video games, with the video games usually referring to galgames. The term is not normally translated into Chinese; if the meaning needs to be translated, it is usually "動漫遊戲" (dòngmànyóuxì, animation, comics and games), "two-dimensional space" (二次元, Èr cìyuán) or "動漫遊" (dòngmànyóu, animation, comics and games).

Etymology 
In 1995, a Taiwanese fan of animation and comics using the name "AIplus" established a board at National Sun Yat-sen University's BBS; the board was named the "ACG_Review Board", referring to animation, comics and games. It is considered the first appearance of the term "ACG". Popularizing by Taiwanese anime and comics critique group Shuffle Alliance, the arrangement of the three letters was stabilized, and the term became popular on the Chinese Mainland, in Hong Kong and Taiwan.

After light novels, which are often adapted into anime, comics and video games, became more popular, the term "ACGN" was coined. However, the term ACG is still used in the majority of situations and is generally thought to include light novels even without "N."

In other regions 

Japanese do not use the term ACG, though a similar concept is "MAG", meaning "Manga, Anime and Games". Japanese speakers usually use  to refer a series of anime and manga culture (containing light novels and garage kits). The  refers to the related-subculture, while  refers to related industries.

In India, AVGC is used instead, referring to Animation, Visual Effects, Gaming, and Comics.

Though the term is common in Sinophone-speaking areas and East Asia, it is not prevalent in the Anglosphere.

See also 

 Anime and manga fandom
 Cosplay
 Doujin
 Glossary of anime and manga
 Otaku

References 

Anime and manga terminology
Chinglish
Comics terminology
National Sun Yat-sen University
Video games in East Asia
Video game terminology